North Carolina Highway 53 (NC 53) is a  primary state highway in the U.S. state of North Carolina that mainly runs west–east in the eastern part of the state.

Route description
The highway begins near Fayetteville in Cumberland County.  It runs through mostly rural areas in Bladen County, Pender County, and Onslow County before emerging near Jacksonville.

The NCDOT extended the highway in August 2010 along the NC 24 bypass around the southern side of the city, then continuing onto Western Boulevard.  This thoroughfare consists of the most commercially used area in the city.  It was done to facilitate ease of obtaining future funding to maintain the roadway there.

History
NC 53 was created in 1923 as a new state route. It ran from NC 50 (where the old US 1, US 15/US 501/NC 87 split is) to Pittsboro. In 1924 NC 53 was extended to Sanford then replaced NC 241 then went down current NC 24 into Fayetteville. In 1928 NC 53 was truncated to Sanford. In 1933 NC 53 was extended to US 701, NC 41, NC 201 in Elizabethtown. In 1934 NC 53 was extended along the entire routing of NC 201 to Jacksonville. Also in 1934 NC 53 was truncated to NC 24 in Fayetteville. In 2010 NC 53 was extended around the NC 24 bypass in Jacksonville to Gum Branch Road where its current terminus is.

North Carolina Highway 601

NC 601 originally ran from NC 60 (current US 421) to NC 40 in Burgaw. In 1930 NC 601 was extended west to Atkinson. The same year NC 601 was extended to NC 24 in Jacksonville. In 1932 NC 601 was renumbered as part of NC 201. Today it is part of NC 53.

Major intersections

See also
 North Carolina Bicycle Route 5 - Concurrent with NC 53 from Sweet Home Church Road near White Lake to Natmore Road in Kelly

References

External links

 
 NCRoads.com: N.C. 53
 NCRoads.com: N.C. 601

053
Transportation in Cumberland County, North Carolina
Transportation in Bladen County, North Carolina
Transportation in Pender County, North Carolina
Transportation in Onslow County, North Carolina